Iris Wittig (9 April 1928, Lengefeld – 30 September 1978) was a German military pilot. She was the first, and only, female fighter pilot in the East German Air Force.

Biography 
Wittig was born in Erzgebirge on 9 April 1928. From 1935 to 1945 her father was imprisoned by the Nazi regime, and from 1944 her mother was incarcerated at Ravensbrück concentration camp. Wittig joined the Communist Party of Germany (KPD) at the age of fifteen, in December 1945, and was active in Free German Youth (FDJ), a youth political movement, from its foundation the following year. After Wittig completed high school, she worked as a tractor driver in Lengefeld, and continued with her activism. In 1950 she became deputy leader of the Volkskammer parliament.

Wittig wanted to do something more challenging than tractor driving, or office work. She contacted General Inspector Heinz Kessler, whose mother had been in Ravensbrück with Wittig's mother. Through this personal connection, she was able to obtain a posting with the Volkspolizei (the national police force). She progressed to the rank of officer in 1953. She began flying, and completed her training with a Soviet instructor on board a Mikoyan-Gurevich MiG-15 aircraft. In 1954 she was involved in a flying accident and as a result of her injuries she had to cease flying jets. Instead, she flew gliders and Yakovlev Yak-18s and in 1956 she became a flight instructor.

Personal life 
Wittig married a pilot, Hans Köhler, with whom she had two children.

References

1928 births
1978 deaths
People from Erzgebirgskreis
Communist Party of Germany members
Socialist Unity Party of Germany politicians
Members of the 1st Volkskammer
Free German Youth members
German women aviators
East German military personnel
German flight instructors
20th-century German women
People from Bezirk Karl-Marx-Stadt
East German women